Bandiwan Mi Ya Sansari is a Marathi movie released on 30 December 1988. The movie has been produced by Prakash Joshi and directed by Arun Karnataki.

Cast 

The cast includes, Asha Kale, Nilu Phule, Lata Arun, Leela Gandhi, Mohan Kotiwan, Vasant Shinde, Maya Jadhav and others.

Soundtrack
The music is directed by Vishwanath More.

Track listing

References

External links 
  Movie Details - cuppax.in
  Asha Bhonsle Discography - mtv.com
 Movie Album - gaana.com

1988 films
1980s Marathi-language films